Salma Khadra Jayyusi (born 1926 or 1927) is a Palestinian poet, writer, translator and anthologist. She is the founder and director of the Project of Translation from Arabic (PROTA), which aims to provide translation of Arabic literature into English.

Life
Salma Khadra Jayyusi was born in Safed to a Palestinian father, the Arab nationalist Subhi al-Khadra, and a Lebanese mother. Attending secondary school in Jerusalem, she studied Arabic and English literature at the American University of Beirut. She married a Jordanian diplomat, with whom she travelled and raised three children.

In 1960, she published her first poetry collection, Return from the Dreamy Fountain. In 1970, she received her PhD on Arabic literature from the University of London. She taught at the University of Khartoum from 1970 to 1973 and at the universities of Algiers and Constantine from 1973 to 1975. In 1973, she was invited by The Middle East Studies Association of North America (MESA) to go on a lecture tour of Canada and the US, on a Ford Foundation Fellowship. In 1975, the University of Utah invited her to return as a visiting professor of Arabic literature, and since then she has been based at various universities in the United States.

To encourage the wider dissemination of Arabic literature and culture, Jayyusi founded the Project of Translation from Arabic in 1980, and later founded East-West Nexus.

Works
 Trends and Movements in Modern Arabic Poetry, 2 vols, 1977
 (ed.) Modern Arabic poetry: an anthology, 1987
 (ed.) The Literature of modern Arabia: an anthology, Columbia University Press, 1988
 (ed.) Anthology of Modern Palestinian Literature, Columbia University Press, 1992
 (ed.) The Legacy of Muslim Spain, 2 vols, 1992
 (ed.) Modern Arabic drama: an anthology, 1995
 (tr. with Trevor LeGassick) 'The Secret life of Saeed: the Pessoptimist by Emile Habibi, 2002.
 (ed.) Short Arabic plays: an anthology, 2003.
 (ed.) Modern Arabic fiction: an anthology, 2004.
 (ed.) Beyond the dunes: an anthology of modern Saudi literature, 2005
 (ed.) Human rights in Arab thought: a reader, 2009
 (ed.) Classical Arabic stories: an anthology, 2010.

Awards
2006 Al Owais Award: Cultural & Scientific Achievements
2020 Sheikh Zayed Book Award: Cultural Personality of the Year

References

1920s births
Living people
People from Safed
20th-century Palestinian poets
20th-century Jordanian poets
Arabic–English translators
Alumni of the University of London
Academic staff of the University of Khartoum
Women anthologists
Palestinian women writers
21st-century Palestinian poets
Palestinian women poets
20th-century Palestinian women writers
21st-century Palestinian women writers
Palestinian poets
21st-century Jordanian poets